Travis Miller may refer to:
Travis Miller (baseball) (born 1972), American baseball player
Travis Miller (racing driver) (born 1988), American race car driver
Lil Ugly Mane (born Travis Miller in 1984), American rapper and producer